The 1961 Louisville Cardinals football team was an American football team that represented the University of Louisville as an independent during the 1961 NCAA College Division football season. In their 16th season under head coach Frank Camp, the Cardinals compiled a 6–3 record.

The team's statistical leaders included Lee Calland with 600 rushing yards, John Giles with 1,209 passing yards, and D. Hockensmith with 392 receiving yards.

Schedule

References

Louisville
Louisville Cardinals football seasons
Louisville Cardinals football